St Christine of Lena is a Roman Catholic Asturian pre-Romanesque church  located in the Lena municipality, about 25 km south of Oviedo, Spain, on an old Roman road that joined the lands of the plateau with Asturias.

Description 
The church has a different ground plan to Pre-Romanesque's traditional basilica. It is a single rectangular space with a barrel vault, with four adjoining structures located in the centre of each facade. The first of these annexes is the typical Asturian Pre-Romanesque vestibule, with a royal tribune on the upper part, accessed via a stairway joined to one of the walls. To the east is the enclosure with the altar, with a single apse, foregoing the traditional Asturian pre-romanesque triple apse, and going back to Visigoth influences. To the north and south respectively, there are two other enclosures through semicircular arches and barrel vaults, whose use was associated with the Hispano-Visigothic liturgy practised in Spain up to the 11th century.

One of the most particular elements of Santa Cristina de Lena is the existence of the presbytery elevated above floor level in the last section of the central nave, separated from the area intended for the congregation by three arches on marble columns. This separation, which appears in other Asturian churches, is not repeated in any other with a similar structure. Both the lattices over the arches and the wall enclosing the central arch were re-used from Visigothic origins in the 7th century.

Gallery

See also 
Asturian art
Catholic Church in Spain

References

External links 

 A virtual tour of the church. Tourismo Asturias on Facebook (published 17 June 2017). Online resource accessed 6 November 2018.

9th-century churches in Spain
World Heritage Sites in Spain
Cristina de Lena
Pre-Romanesque architecture in Asturias
9th-century establishments in Spain
Bien de Interés Cultural landmarks in Asturias
Religious buildings and structures completed in 852